The visa policy of Somaliland dictates the use and acquisition of visas in Somaliland. In accordance with the law, citizens of all countries require a visa to visit Somaliland. Somaliland and Somalia have completely different visa policies and Somaliland authorities do not recognize national visas issued by Somalia.

Visa types
 Tourist Visa
 Business Visa
 Health Visa
 Education Visa
 Transit visa

Visitor visa policy map

Visa on arrival

Holders of passports issued by the following countries below can obtain a visa on arrival at all border checkpoints including Hargeisa Airport:

Visa prior to travel 
Visas are also issued at the Somaliland embassy in neighbouring Ethiopia's capital Addis Ababa. Additionally, a visa can be sought via application at the Somaliland representative office in London.

See also

Somaliland Immigration and Border Control
Visa policy of Somalia
Visa requirements for Somaliland citizens
Somaliland passport

References

Somaliland
Foreign relations of Somaliland